The Chinese Rites controversy was a dispute among Roman Catholic missionaries over the religiosity of Confucianism and Chinese rituals during the 17th and 18th centuries. The debate discussed whether Chinese ritual practices of honoring family ancestors and other formal Confucian and Chinese imperial rites qualified as religious rites and were thus incompatible with Catholic belief. The Jesuits argued that these Chinese rites were secular rituals that were compatible with Christianity, within certain limits, and should thus be tolerated. The Dominicans and Franciscans, however, disagreed and reported the issue to Rome.

Rome's Sacred Congregation for the Propagation of the Faith sided with the Dominicans in 1645 by condemning the Chinese rites based on their brief. However, the same congregation sided with the Jesuits in 1656, thereby lifting the ban. It was one of the many disputes between the Jesuits and the Dominicans in China and elsewhere in Asia, including Japan and India. The conflict between the Jesuits and their opponents took on a historical dimension, with the former insisting that Europeans and the Chinese had a shared history, which was taken to legitimise the Jesuit "accommodation" of Chinese rites and names for the Christian God.

The controversy embroiled leading European universities; the Qing dynasty's Kangxi Emperor and several popes (including Clement XI and Clement XIV) considered the case; the offices of the Holy See also intervened. Near the end of the 17th century, many Dominicans and Franciscans had shifted their positions in agreeing with the Jesuits' opinion, but Rome disagreed. Clement XI banned the rites in 1704. In 1742, Benedict XIV reaffirmed the ban and forbade debate.

In 1939, after two centuries, the Holy See re-assessed the issue. Pius XII issued a decree on 8 December 1939, authorizing Chinese Catholics to observe the ancestral rites and participate in Confucius-honoring ceremonies. The general principle of sometimes admitting native traditions even into the liturgy of the church, provided that such traditions harmonize with the true and authentic spirit of the liturgy, was proclaimed by the Second Vatican Council (1962–65).

Background

Early adaptation to local customs

Unlike the American landmass, which had been conquered by military force by Spain and Portugal, European missionaries encountered in Asia united, literate societies that were as yet untouched by European influence or national endeavor.

Alessandro Valignano, Visitor of the Society of Jesus in Asia, was one of the first Jesuits to argue, in the case of Japan, for an adaptation of Christian customs to the societies of Asia, through his Résolutions and Cérémonial.

Matteo Ricci's policy of accommodation
In China, Matteo Ricci reused the Cérémonial and adapted it to the Chinese context. At one point the Jesuits even started to wear the gown of Buddhist monks, before adopting the more prestigious silk gown of Chinese literati. In particular, Matteo Ricci's Christian views on Confucianism and Chinese rituals, often called the "", were followed by Jesuit missionaries in China and Korea.

In a decree signed on 23 March 1656, Pope Alexander VII accepted practices "favorable to Chinese customs", reinforcing 1615 decrees which accepted the usage of the Chinese language in liturgy, a notable exception to the contemporary Latin Catholic discipline which had generally forbidden the use of local languages.

In the 1659 instructions given by the Sacred Congregation for the Propagation of the Faith (known as the Propaganda Fidei) to new missionaries to Asia, provisions were clearly made to the effect that adapting to local customs and respecting the habits of the countries to be evangelized was paramount:

Reception in China

The Jesuit order was successful in penetrating China and serving at the Imperial court. They impressed the Chinese with their knowledge of European astronomy and mechanics, and in fact ran the Imperial Observatory. The Kangxi Emperor was at first friendly to the Jesuit Missionaries working in China. Their accurate methods allowed him to successfully predict eclipses, one of his ritual duties. He was grateful for the services they provided to him, in the areas of astronomy, diplomacy and artillery manufacture. Jesuit translators Jean-François Gerbillon and Thomas Pereira took part in the negotiations of the Treaty of Nerchinsk in 1689, where they assisted with translation. The Jesuits made an important contribution to the Empire's military, with the diffusion of European artillery technology, and they directed the castings of cannons of various calibers. The Kangxi Emperor also retained several Jesuits in his court as scientists and artists. By the end of the seventeenth century, the Jesuits had made many converts. They in turn were impressed by the knowledge and intelligence of the Han Chinese Confucian scholar elite, and adapted to their ancient Chinese intellectual lifestyle.

In 1692, Kangxi issued an edict of toleration of Christianity ( or ).

This edict enabled Christianity to be perceived by the state with "positive neutrality" and acceptable in the eyes of Confucian orthodoxy.

Controversy

The Jesuits gradually developed and adopted a policy of accommodation on the issue of Chinese rites. The Chinese scholar elite were attached to Confucianism, and while Buddhism and Daoism were in decline and losing patronage, Confucianism was arguably at its golden age during this period of Chinese History; even a rich urban class of merchants pursued it. Despite this, all three provided the framework of both state and home life. Part of Confucian and Taoist practices involved veneration of one's ancestors.

Besides the Jesuits, other religious orders such as the Dominicans, Franciscans, and Augustinians started missionary work in China during the 17th century, often coming from the Spanish colony of the Philippines.
Contrary to the Jesuits, they refused any adaptation to local customs and wished to apply in China the same tabula rasa principle they had applied in other places, and were horrified by the practices of the Jesuits.

They ignited a heated controversy and brought it to Rome. They raised three main points of contention:
 Determination of the Chinese word for "God", which was generally accepted as 天主 Tiānzhǔ (Lord of Heaven), while Jesuits were willing to allow Chinese Christians to use 天 Tiān (Heaven) or 上帝 Shàngdì (Lord Above / Supreme Emperor)
 Prohibition of Christians from participating in the seasonal rites for Confucius.
 Prohibition of Christians from using of tablets with the forbidden inscription "site of the soul", and from following the Chinese rites for the ancestor worship.

In Rome, the Jesuits tried to argue that these "Chinese Rites" were civic rituals, rather than religious, and that converts should be allowed to continue to participate. They maintained that Chinese folk religion and offerings to the Emperor and departed ancestors were civil in nature and therefore not incompatible with Catholicism, while their opponents argued that these kinds of worship were an expression of native religion and thus incompatible with Catholic beliefs.

Pope Clement XI's decree

Pope Clement XI condemned the Chinese rites and Confucian rituals, and outlawed any further discussion in 1704, with the anti-rites decree Cum Deus optimus of 20 November 1704.
It forbade the use of "Tiān" and "Shàngdì", while approving Tiānzhǔ ('Lord of Heaven').

In 1705, the Pope sent a Papal Legate to the Kangxi Emperor, to communicate to him the interdiction of Chinese rites. The mission, led by Charles-Thomas Maillard De Tournon, communicated the prohibition of Chinese rites in January 1707, but as a result was banished to Macao.

Further, the Pope issued the 19 March 1715 Papal bull Ex illa die which officially condemned the Chinese rites:

Clement XI's decree was reiterated by Benedict XIV in his 1742 papal bull Ex quo singulari. Benedict demanded that missionaries in China take an oath forbidding them to discuss the issue again.

Imperial ban and papal suppression
In the early 18th century, Rome's challenge to the Chinese Rites led to the expulsion of Catholic missionaries from China. In July 1706, the Papal Legate Charles-Thomas Maillard De Tournon angered the Kangxi Emperor, who issued an order that all missionaries, in order to obtain an imperial permit (piao) to stay in China, would have to declare that they would follow 'the rules of Matteo Ricci'.

In 1721, the Kangxi Emperor disagreed with Clement's decree and banned Christian missions in China. In the Decree of Kangxi, he stated,

Chinese converts were also involved in the controversy through letters of protest, books, pamphlets, etc. The Controversy debate was most intense between a group of Christian literati and a Catholic Bishop (named Charles Maigrot de Crissey) in Fujian province, with the Chinese group of converts supporting the Jesuits and the bishop supported by less accommodating Iberian mendicants (Dominicans and Franciscans).

In 1724 the Yongzheng Emperor proscribed the Heavenly Lord sect (Tianzhu jiao, the name given Catholicism in China in that period). Persecution steadily increased during the reign of the Yongzheng Emperor. While the Yongzheng Emperor appreciated and admired the Jesuit Giuseppe Castiglione's artwork and western technologies, he also reinforced anti-Christian policies in 1737.

Pope Pius XII's decision

The Rites controversy continued to hamper Church efforts to gain converts in China. In 1939, a few weeks after his election to the papacy, Pope Pius XII ordered the Congregation for the Evangelization of Peoples to relax certain aspects of Clement XI's and Benedict XIV's decrees. After the Apostolic Vicars had received guarantees from the Manchukuo Government that confirmed the mere "civil" characteristics of the so-called "Chinese rites", the Holy See released, on 8 December 1939, a new decree, known as Plane Compertum, stating:

Overall, Plane Compertum asserted:
 Catholics are permitted to be present at ceremonies in honor of Confucius in Confucian temples or in schools;
 Erection of an image of Confucius or tablet with his name on is permitted in Catholic schools.
 Catholic magistrates and students are permitted to passively attend public ceremonies which have the appearance of superstition.
 It is licit and unobjectionable for head inclinations and other manifestations of civil observance before the deceased or their images.
 The oath on the Chinese rites, which was prescribed by Benedict XIV, is not fully in accord with recent regulations and is superfluous.

According to Pope Pius XII's biographer, Jan Olav Smit, this meant that Chinese customs were no longer considered superstitious, but were an honourable way of esteeming one's relatives and therefore permitted by Catholic Christians. Confucianism was also thus recognized as a philosophy and an integral part of Chinese culture rather than as a heathen religion in conflict with Catholicism. Shortly afterwards, in 1943, the Government of China established diplomatic relations with the Vatican. The Papal decree changed the ecclesiastical situation in China in an almost revolutionary way.

As the Church began to flourish, Pius XII established a local ecclesiastical hierarchy, and, on 18 February 1946, named Thomas Tien Ken-sin, who was from 18 July 1939 Apostolic Vicar of Qingdao, as the first Chinese national in the Sacred College of Cardinals and later that year – on 10 May 1946 – appointed him to the Archdiocese of Beijing.

See also 

 Chinese ancestor veneration
 Chinese ancestral hall and ancestral tablet
 Malabar rites

References

Citations

Sources

Further reading
 
 Wu, Huiyi. (2017). Traduire la Chine au XVIIIe siècle: Les Jésuites traducteurs de textes chinois et le renouvellement des connaissances sur la Chine (1687 – ca. 1740). Paris: Honoré Champion. ISBN 978-2-7453-3182-3
 Giovannetti-Singh, Gianamar (2022). "Rethinking the Rites Controversy: Kilian Stumpf's Acta Pekinensia and the Historical Dimensions of a Religious Quarrel" Modern Intellectual History 19(1).
 Rule, Paul A. (2004). "The Chinese Rites Controversy: A Long Lasting Controversy in Sino-Western Cultural History" Pacific Rim Report (32).

17th-century Catholicism
18th-century Catholicism
Controversies in China
17th-century controversies
18th-century controversies
17th century in China
18th century in China
Catholicism-related controversies
Catholicism in China
History of Catholicism in Asia
Jesuit China missions
Jesuit history in Asia
Pope Pius XII foreign relations
History of Christianity in China
Religious Confucianism